The Christmas Party (Danish: Julestuen) is a one-set, comic play by Norwegian-Danish playwright Ludvig Holberg. It premiered at Lille Grønnegade Theatre in Copenhagen in 1724.

Plot summary
Jeronimus, a grumpy, old man, refuses to host a Christmas party in his house since he finds the tradition tasteless and inappropriate. His sister unsuccessfully tries to persuade him but he is finally won over by s mastershoemaker's arguments about the "foundation of the law of nature".

English translations

References

External links

Plays by Ludvig Holberg
1724 plays